A Trick of the Tail is the seventh studio album by English progressive rock band Genesis. It was released in February 1976 on Charisma Records and was the first album to feature drummer Phil Collins as lead vocalist following the departure of Peter Gabriel. It was a critical and commercial success in the UK and U.S., reaching No. 3 and No. 31 respectively.

Following Gabriel's decision to leave the band, the remaining members wanted to carry on and show they could still write and record successful material. The group wrote and rehearsed new songs during mid-1975, and listened to numerous audition tapes for a replacement frontman. They entered Trident Studios in October with producer David Hentschel to record the album without a definitive idea of who was going to perform lead vocals. After the search for a singer proved unfruitful, Collins was persuaded to sing "Squonk", and the performance was so strong, he sang lead on the rest of the album.

Upon release, critics were impressed by the improved sound quality and the group's ability to survive the loss of Gabriel without sacrificing the quality of the music. The group went out on tour with Collins as frontman and Bill Bruford as an additional drummer, and the resulting performances in the US raised Genesis' profile there. The album has been reissued on CD several times, including a deluxe package with bonus tracks in 2007.

Background 
Founding member and lead singer Peter Gabriel decided to leave Genesis in late 1974, early in the tour for the album The Lamb Lies Down on Broadway. His bandmates hoped he would reconsider, as they were still in debt and felt his departure could destroy the band's future, but ultimately accepted that he would leave. The remaining members wanted to continue to collaborate musically, and show journalists and critics they were primarily a song writing team that could still produce good music. Keyboardist Tony Banks had been close to Gabriel personally, and did not want the band to split up on top of seeing less of one of his best friends. He had written a number of songs for a possible solo project before deciding they should be used on the new Genesis album.

Following the end of the tour, guitarist Steve Hackett recorded a solo album, Voyage of the Acolyte with guitarist/bassist Mike Rutherford and drummer Phil Collins, feeling unsure that Genesis would survive. He reconvened with the remaining group members in July 1975. Banks and Rutherford were particularly keen to write and record new material so that critics and fans would accept Gabriel's departure. The group began rehearsals in a basement studio in Acton, and quickly wrote material they were happy with, but had not yet found a replacement lead singer. They placed an anonymous advertisement in the music paper Melody Maker for "a singer for a Genesis-type group", which received around 400 replies. Some applicants sent photographs of themselves in costume and wearing masks, as Gabriel had done on stage. A few weeks into rehearsals, Melody Maker managed to find out about Gabriel leaving the band, and their story made the front page of the 16 August issue, where journalist Chris Welch declared Genesis dead. The group spoke to the music papers to deny they were splitting up and explained they had a new album written and waiting to be recorded.

Recording 

Recording began in Trident Studios in October 1975 with producer David Hentschel. On previous Genesis albums Hentschel had served as tape op and (later) as engineer; Collins had become a fan of his album Startling Music, a re-recording of Ringo Starr's album Ringo on an ARP 2500 synthesizer. Collins thought the group could carry on as an instrumental act, but the others felt that it would be boring without vocals. The group had still not decided on a replacement singer, so they decided to start recording backing tracks and audition singers as they went. Gabriel visited the band in the studio and listened to the album, and thought they had succeeded in proving to others that they still were "a whole, strong band without me". He knew that the group could write strong material, but the little effort it took them surprised him the most.

Some songs such as "Ripples..." were written with the intention that Collins could sing them, similar to "More Fool Me" on Selling England by the Pound, but he did not want to take over as a permanent replacement, opting instead to teach potential lead singers the songs. The group still wanted a regular frontman for live performances, as they thought Collins would not be able to handle all the material, and it would be problematic trying to sing Gabriel's vocal parts while drumming on tour. One of the auditionees, Mick Stickland, was invited into the studio to sing, but the backing tracks were in a key outside of his natural range and the band decided not to work with him. Having failed to produce a suitable vocalist, Collins reluctantly went in the studio to sing "Squonk". His performance was well received by the band, and they decided that he should be their new lead singer. Hentschel stayed on as co-producer for future Genesis albums up to 1980's Duke.

Songs 

The opening track, "Dance on a Volcano", was the first song written for the album. Rutherford felt that, in contrast to the material on The Lamb..., it was easy to write, and was intended to show how Genesis would move forward. "Entangled" originated from a piece by Hackett that Banks particularly liked and went on to write the chorus and closing synthesiser solo. Hackett also wrote the lyrics which Collins thought had a Mary Poppins feel to them. Rutherford recalled that Hackett "started writing verses which were very airy-fairy and then he came down with a bang". "Squonk" is based on the North American tale of the Squonk which, when captured, dissolves in a pool of tears. The song combines a main theme written by Rutherford against a middle section written by Banks, and was designed to sound like Led Zeppelin's "Kashmir".

"Robbery, Assault and Battery" was mostly written by Banks, in an attempt to replicate the humour in some of Gabriel's lyrics. Collins, who also contributed to the writing, sang the song in character, inspired by his earlier role as the Artful Dodger in Oliver! before he became a professional musician. "Ripples..." was a combination of a 12-string guitar piece composed by Rutherford and a piano-led middle section written by Banks. Banks's track "A Trick of the Tail" took form as a song some years before the band recorded it. He was inspired from reading the novel The Inheritors by William Golding and "Getting Better" by the Beatles, and wrote about an alien visiting Earth. When it came to selecting tracks for the album, he wanted to include "something lighter and more quirky."

The closing song, "Los Endos", was written by the whole band. Collins came up with the basic rhythmic structure, inspired by his work in side project Brand X and "Promise of a Fisherman" by Santana, wanting to take the looser playing style into Genesis. Banks and Hackett wrote the main themes, including reprises of "Dance on a Volcano" and "Squonk", and Collins sang a few lines from "Supper's Ready" (on the 1972 album Foxtrot) on the fade-out, as a tribute and final goodbye to Gabriel. The opening piece was recorded for a completely different song, "It's Yourself", which was later released as a B-side. The track became a live favourite, and continued to be played through to the 2007 Turn It On Again tour. In 2014, Hackett added the song to the playlist of his extended Genesis Revisited II tour.

Reception 

A Trick of the Tail had a positive reception from music critics, who were impressed that the group could not only survive the loss of Gabriel but still deliver a good album. The sound quality had improved from previous albums as a result of Hentschel's production skills. The album reached No. 3 in the UK and No. 31 in the U.S. It was certified Gold in the UK by the British Phonographic Industry in June and in the US by the RIAA in March 1990. The album remained in the UK charts for 39 weeks and recouped a significant amount of the $400,000 worth of debt they had accumulated by the time Gabriel left.

For the first time in their career, Genesis filmed promotional videos for their songs. The first to be filmed was the title track, which features the band playing to the song together around a piano, including composite shots of a miniature Collins hopping around on a piano and a guitar. The group also produced promotional films of "Ripples..." and "Robbery, Assault and Battery".

Tour 

Even after the album had been completed, Collins was unhappy about leaving the drumkit to sing lead, and the band were unsure he would be comfortable as frontman on tour. The group decided to try anyway, and needed someone to drum while Collins was singing. Collins insisted on choosing the touring drummer himself, selecting Bill Bruford, with whom he had already worked in Brand X. Collins continued to drum during instrumental sections.

The new line-up rehearsed in Dallas for a North American tour, which began in London, Ontario. Collins was nervous about what to say to the audience between songs, so Rutherford and Hackett helped with some announcements. Unlike Gabriel's theatrical approach, Collins developed a humorous rapport with the audience, and it was immediately successful. Audiences were happy to hear Collins sing old material such as "Supper's Ready" in concert, and the resulting tour raised Genesis' profile in the U.S., where they had been relatively unknown while Gabriel was in the band.

Track listing 
This is the first Genesis album to credit songwriters individually, as opposed to the band as a whole.

2007 SACD/CD/DVD release 
A new version of A Trick of the Tail was released in the UK/Europe/Japan by Virgin/EMI & in the US by Atlantic/Rhino in 2007 as part of the Genesis 1976–1982 box set. This includes the entire album in remixed stereo, surround sound, and related video tracks. A further DVD release includes audio and video tracks, including an interview with the band, the promotional videos, and the film Genesis: In Concert, filmed during the 1976 tour promoting the album.

Personnel 
Genesis
 Phil Collins – drums, percussion, lead and backing vocals
 Steve Hackett – electric guitar, 12-string guitars
 Mike Rutherford – bass guitar, bass pedals, 12-string guitar, backing vocals
 Tony Banks – pianos, synthesizers, Hammond organ, Mellotron, 12-string guitar, backing vocals

Production
 Genesis – production
 David Hentschel – production, engineering
 Nick "Haddock" Bradford – engineering
 Tex and Jeff – equipment
 Neal, John and Terry – liquid sustenance
 Hipgnosis – sleeve design
 Colin Elgie – sleeve design
 Special thanks to Tony Smith, Alex Sim and Regis
 Recorded at Trident Studios, London

Charts

Weekly charts

Year-end charts

Certifications

References 
Citations

Sources

Genesis (band) albums
1976 albums
Albums with cover art by Hipgnosis
Virgin Records albums
Atlantic Records albums
Albums produced by David Hentschel
Albums recorded at Trident Studios
Atco Records albums
Charisma Records albums
Albums produced by Phil Collins
Albums produced by Tony Banks (musician)
Albums produced by Mike Rutherford